Redoubtable (released as Godard Mon Amour in the United States) is a 2017 French biographical comedy-drama film written and directed by Michel Hazanavicius about the affair of filmmaker Jean-Luc Godard with Anne Wiazemsky in the late 1960s, during the making of his film La Chinoise (1967). It was selected to compete for the Palme d'Or in the main competition section at the 2017 Cannes Film Festival.

Cast
 Louis Garrel as Jean-Luc Godard
 Stacy Martin as Anne Wiazemsky
 Bérénice Bejo as Michèle Rosier
 Micha Lescot as Jean-Pierre Bamberger
 Grégory Gadebois as Michel Cournot
 Guido Caprino as Bernardo Bertolucci
 Quentin Dolmaire as Paul

Reception
On the review aggregator website Rotten Tomatoes, the film has an approval rating of 54% based on 89 reviews, and an average rating of 5.8/10. The website's critics consensus reads, "Godard Mon Amour imagines a chapter from Jean-Luc Godard's life with no shortage of whimsy, but lacks its subject's essential inspiration." On Metacritic, the film has a weighted average score of 55 out of 100, based on 24 critics, indicating "generally favorable reviews".

References

External links
 
 
 
 
 

2017 films
2017 biographical drama films
2017 romantic comedy-drama films
2010s French films
2010s French-language films
Biographical films about film directors and producers
Comedy films based on actual events
Films based on French novels
Films directed by Michel Hazanavicius
Films set in the 1960s
Films set in Paris
Films shot in Paris
Films shot in Rome
France 3 Cinéma films
French biographical drama films
French romantic comedy-drama films
Romance films based on actual events
StudioCanal films